Kirby Paul Smart (born December 23, 1975) is an American football coach and former player. He is the current head football coach of the Georgia Bulldogs, his alma mater. As head coach, he led the Bulldogs to back-to-back National Championship victories in 2022 and 2023.

Early life
Smart was born in Montgomery, Alabama, and grew up in Bainbridge, Georgia. Smart began his playing career at Bainbridge High School and went on to play college football at the University of Georgia, where he was teammates with defensive linemen Antonio Cochran, Emarlos Leroy, linebacker Brandon Tolbert, Pro Football Hall of Fame cornerback Champ Bailey, and Super Bowl MVP Hines Ward. Smart was a four-year letterman at defensive back for Georgia and a first-team All-SEC selection as a senior. He finished his career with 13 interceptions, which ranks fourth all-time at Georgia, and led the Bulldogs with six interceptions in 1997 and five in 1998. He was also a four-time member of the SEC Academic Honor Roll. Smart graduated from Georgia in 1999 with a degree in finance. He went undrafted in the 1999 NFL Draft and signed a free-agent contract with the Indianapolis Colts. He spent the 1999 preseason with the team but was cut before the start of the regular season. In 2003, Kirby attended Florida State University for graduate school.

Coaching career

Early career
Smart began his coaching career with the University of Georgia in 1999, serving as an administrative assistant. He then moved to Valdosta State where he spent one season as defensive backs coach before being promoted to defensive coordinator for the 2001 season. From 2002 to 2003, Smart worked as a graduate assistant under Bobby Bowden at Florida State while pursuing a master's degree. He received his master's degree from FSU in 2003. Smart then spent one season as defensive backs coach at LSU under head coach Nick Saban in 2004. Smart rejoined the Georgia Bulldogs football program to serve as running backs coach for the 2005 season. His only season in the NFL came in 2006, during which time he coached under Saban again, this time as the Miami Dolphins safeties coach.

Alabama
Smart followed Nick Saban to the University of Alabama in 2007. He was hired by Saban as an assistant coach on January 9. On February 27, 2008, Smart was promoted to defensive coordinator. On December 8, 2009, Smart was awarded the Broyles Award as the nation's best assistant coach. He was the first Alabama assistant coach to win the award.  Alabama would go on to win the BCS National Championship.  Smart considered a lucrative contract to be the defensive coordinator at his alma mater, the University of Georgia but chose to stay with the Crimson Tide in early January 2010. In 2011, Smart's defense helped Alabama win another championship, beating LSU in the 2012 BCS National Championship Game. On March 27, 2012, the University of Alabama System's Board Of Trustees voted to increase Smart's salary and extend his contract. On November 20, 2012, Smart was recognized as the 2012 AFCA FBS Assistant Coach of the Year. Alabama would win another national championship, beating Notre Dame with a bruising defense. On April 16, 2013, Smart was granted a $200,000 salary increase to make him the highest-paid defensive coordinator in college football.

Georgia

On December 6, 2015, Smart was announced as the 26th head football coach at the University of Georgia. Smart went 8–5 in his first season as the head coach of the Bulldogs in 2016. The Bulldogs finished tied for second in the SEC East division.

In the 2017 season, Smart led the Bulldogs to their first 9–0 start since 1982 and won the SEC East after a victory over the South Carolina Gamecocks on November 4. On December 2, 2017, Smart coached Georgia to its first SEC title since 2005, and only the fourth 12-win season in school history (1980, 2002, 2012). On December 3, Georgia was ranked No. 3 by the College Football Playoff Committee. Georgia played No. 2 Oklahoma in the College Football Playoff semifinal game at the Rose Bowl. Georgia rallied from a 31–17 first-half deficit, ultimately defeating Oklahoma 54–48 in double overtime. The Bulldogs went on to lose to Alabama in the National Championship Game 26–23, where Alabama freshman quarterback Tua Tagovailoa relieved Jalen Hurts late in the contest and ended the game on a 41-yard touchdown completion to DeVonta Smith in overtime.

In the 2018 season, Georgia completed the regular season with an 11–1 record and earned a spot in the SEC Championship game as the Eastern Division Champions, but lost to Alabama, 35–28. The No. 5 Georgia Bulldogs then earned an invitation to play in the Sugar Bowl, where they lost to No. 15 Texas, 28–21.

In 2019, Georgia had a regular-season record of 11–1 and won the SEC East for the third consecutive season, but lost to LSU in the SEC Championship game, 37–10. Georgia, ranked No. 5 entering the bowl season, beat No. 7 Baylor in the Sugar Bowl, 26–14.

In 2020, Georgia's regular-season record was 7–2. The season was shortened because of the COVID-19 pandemic; all four games against non-SEC opponents were canceled, though Georgia played one more game than usual against SEC opponents. Georgia finished the regular season in second place in the SEC East. In the subsequent bowl season, the No. 9 Bulldogs beat No. 8 Cincinnati in the Peach Bowl, 24–21.

In 2021, Georgia went 12–0 in the regular season, then lost to Alabama in the SEC Championship game, 41–24. Georgia was ranked No. 3 after this game. The Bulldogs beat No. 2 Michigan in the College Football Playoff semifinal game at the Orange Bowl, 34–11, then defeated No. 1 Alabama in the National Championship game, 33–18, to secure their first national championship since 1980.  With this victory, Smart became the first of Saban's former assistants at Alabama and just the second overall to defeat Saban (Jimbo Fisher, a former assistant at LSU and the head coach at Texas A&M, was the first after his unranked Aggies team upset the Crimson Tide earlier in the season).

In July 2022, Smart and Georgia agreed to a 10-year contract extension worth $112.5 million, making him the highest-paid coach in college football. In the 2022 season, Georgia went 12-0 once more in the regular season before defeating LSU in the SEC Championship game, 50–30. Georgia would then defeat Ohio State in the Peach Bowl 42-41 in a close contest. In the National Championship game, Georgia would beat TCU 65-7, making Kirby Smart a back-to-back national championship-winning coach, the first one since Nick Saban did so with Alabama in 2011 and 2012.

Personal life

Smart is married to Mary "Beth" Elizabeth Lycett, who played basketball for the University of Georgia. The couple has three children.

Head coaching record

References

External links

 Coaching statistics at Sports-Reference.com
 Georgia Bulldogs bio

1975 births
Living people
Alabama Crimson Tide football coaches
American football defensive backs
Florida State Seminoles football coaches
Georgia Bulldogs football coaches
Georgia Bulldogs football players
LSU Tigers football coaches
Miami Dolphins coaches
Valdosta State Blazers football coaches
Florida State University alumni
People from Bainbridge, Georgia
Sportspeople from Montgomery, Alabama
Coaches of American football from Georgia (U.S. state)
Players of American football from Georgia (U.S. state)
Players of American football from Montgomery, Alabama